Virgulariidae is a family of sea pens, a member of the subclass Octocorallia in the phylum Cnidaria.

Characteristics
Colonies are bilateral, long and slender to very slender. The colony axis is noticeable and present throughout.

Genera
The World Register of Marine Species lists the following genera:
Acanthoptilum Kölliker, 1870
Grasshoffia Williams, 2015
Scytaliopsis Gravier, 1906
Scytalium Herklots, 1858
Stylatula Verrill, 1864
Virgularia Lamarck, 1816

References

 
Pennatulacea
Cnidarian families